Dodson is a town in Phillips County, Montana, United States. The population was 125 at the 2020 census.

History
Dodson was named after a merchant who operated a trading post and saloon there before the Great Northern Railway came through. The first post office was established in 1891.

Geography
Dodson is located at  (48.395327, -108.245906).

Climate
According to the Köppen Climate Classification system, Dodson has a semi-arid climate, abbreviated "BSk" on climate maps.

Demographics

2010 census
As of the census of 2010, there were 124 people, 49 households, and 32 families residing in the town. The racial makeup of the town was 41.9% White, 49.2% Native American, 2.4% from other races, and 6.5% from two or more races. Hispanic or Latino of any race were 6.5% of the population.

There were 49 households, of which 38.8% had children under the age of 18 living with them, 40.8% were married couples living together, 16.3% had a female householder with no husband present, 8.2% had a male householder with no wife present, and 34.7% were non-families. 32.7% of all households were made up of individuals, and 12.3% had someone living alone who was 65 years of age or older. The average household size was 2.53 and the average family size was 3.16.

The median age in the town was 35.5 years. 32.3% of residents were under the age of 18; 6.4% were between the ages of 18 and 24; 21.7% were from 25 to 44; 15.2% were from 45 to 64; and 24.2% were 65 years of age or older. The gender makeup of the town was 54.8% male and 45.2% female.

2000 census
As of the census of 2000, there were 122 people, 49 households, and 34 families residing in the town. The population density was 648.4 people per square mile (247.9/km2). There were 66 housing units at an average density of 350.8 per square mile (134.1/km2). The racial makeup of the town was 50.00% White, 45.08% Native American, 0.82% Asian, and 4.10% from two or more races. Hispanic or Latino of any race were 2.46% of the population.

There were 49 households, out of which 40.8% had children under the age of 18 living with them, 49.0% were married couples living together, 14.3% had a female householder with no husband present, and 28.6% were non-families. 28.6% of all households were made up of individuals, and 20.4% had someone living alone who was 65 years of age or older. The average household size was 2.49 and the average family size was 2.97.

In the town, the population was spread out, with 33.6% under the age of 18, 4.9% from 18 to 24, 20.5% from 25 to 44, 19.7% from 45 to 64, and 21.3% who were 65 years of age or older. The median age was 39 years. For every 100 females, there were 87.7 males. For every 100 females age 18 and over, there were 76.1 males.

The median income for a household in the town was $19,464, and the median income for a family was $33,750. Males had a median income of $21,250 versus $33,125 for females. The per capita income for the town was $10,187. There were 23.7% of families and 28.9% of the population living below the poverty line, including 44.7% of under eighteens and 11.1% of those over 64.

Education
Dodson School District educates students from kindergarten through 12th grade. Dodson High School's team name is the Coyotes.

Phillips County Library has a branch location in Dodson.

Events
Dodson is the location of the Phillips County Fair, which claims to be the longest-running fair in Montana.

See also

 List of municipalities in Montana

References

External links

 Phillips County Fair website

Towns in Phillips County, Montana